Producer's Representatives, or Producer's Reps, aid film producers in selling films direct to studios and networks.  Typically they act as a liaison between the film producer and film distributor. American producer's reps include: Scotty Gelt, Jeff_Dowd, Buffalo 8, Ben Yennie, Noor Ahmed, Andrew Herwitz.

References

Filmmaking occupations